Vladimir Kotov (born February 21, 1958, in Dolzha, Vitebsk) is a Belarus-born South African long-distance runner, who competed for the Soviet Union at the marathon of the 1980 Summer Olympics in Moscow. There he finished in fourth place, thirty seconds behind countryman and bronze medalist Setymkul Dzhumanazarov. Kotov has a very long career in athletics, during which he won the Eindhoven Marathon for instance, on October 13, 1991, and the Belgrade Marathon on April 22, 1995. He now lives in South Africa, where he is known for winning the Comrades Marathon three times (2000, 2002, 2004), setting the "Up Run" record in 2000. He finished 13th in the 2010 Comrades Marathon.

Achievements

External links
 
 sports-reference

1958 births
Living people
South African ultramarathon runners
Russian male marathon runners
Belarusian male long-distance runners
Olympic athletes of the Soviet Union
Athletes (track and field) at the 1980 Summer Olympics
Belarusian emigrants
Soviet male marathon runners
Belarusian male marathon runners
Male ultramarathon runners
Sportspeople from Vitebsk
Taipei Marathon male winners